Brenda Schultz was the defending champion, but lost in the final to Barbara Rittner. The score was 7–6(7–3), 6–3.

Seeds

Draw

Finals

Top half

Bottom half

References

External links
 Official results archive (ITF)
 Official results archive (WTA)

Women's Singles
Singles